Libon was a 5th-century BC architect of Ancient Greece. Born in Elis, he built the Doric Temple of Zeus at Olympia in about 460 BC. Libon, through his work on the Temple, is said to have inspired the technique and design of the Parthenon on the Athenian Acropolis – though this was obviously later and more perfected.

Notes

References
 

Ancient Greek architects
5th-century BC Greek people